Open All Night may refer to:

 Open All Night (book), a 1922 short story collection by Paul Morand
 Open All Night (1924 film), an American silent film directed by Paul Bern, based on Morand's book
 Open All Night (1934 film), a British drama directed by George Pearson
 Open All Night (TV series), a 1981-1982 American sitcom
 "Open All Night" (song), a 1982 song by Bruce Springsteen
 Open All Night (Georgia Satellites album), a 1988 album by Georgia Satellites
 Open All Night (Marc Almond album), a 1999 album by Marc Almond

See also 
 Up All Night (disambiguation)